The 2010–11 Slovenian Second League season began on 8 August 2010 and ended on 29 May 2011. Each team played a total of 27 matches.

Clubs

League standing

See also
2010–11 Slovenian PrvaLiga
2010–11 Slovenian Third League

References

External links
Football Association of Slovenia 

Slovenian Second League seasons
2010–11 in Slovenian football
Slovenia